The English Secretary (originally The English Secretorie) is a book by the rhetorician Angel Day, first published in 1586. Among the most important manuals of letter writing in the 16th and 17th centuries, the work combines influences from medieval practices and Renaissance humanism, and reflects the expansion of the reading public in Elizabethan England.

References

External links
The English Secretorie at Folger Shakespeare Library
Angel Day, The English Secretary (1599) at Brigham Young University

1586 books
Rhetoric works